ULK may refer to:
 Kigali Independent University, a university in Rwanda
 Université Libre de Kinshasa, a private university in Kinshasa, Democratic Republic of the Congo
 Lensk Airport, IATA code
 Enzymes of the Unc-51-like kinase (ULK) family
 ULK1
 ULK2
 ULK3
 ULK4

ulk
 Meriam language, ISO 639-3 code

Ulk
Ulk, a German satirical magazine
Ulk (dog), of Chilean president Arturo Alessandri